6 South African Infantry Battalion is an air assault infantry unit of the South African Army.

History 
6 SAI was established on 1 January 1962, at  Grahamstown, Eastern Cape. The new training unit was housed on the property previously used by 44 Air School established by the Royal Air Force during the Second World War.

Bush War/ Namibia
The battalion became operational in 1970. 6 SAI took part in Operation Protea and Operation Daisy in Angola.

1984 Grahamstown riots
The Unit was involved in quelling the 1984 Grahamstown riots. The army had been called in to assist the South African Police who had failed to contain the situation.

Air Assault Infantry
The battalion has since become an air assault infantry unit specifically trained to deploy via helicopters.

The battalion was deployed in April 2013 to the eastern Democratic Republic of Congo (DRC) as part of the United Nations Force Intervention Brigade.

Battle for Kibati

In 2013, 850 members of 6 SAI were part of the United Nations (UN) Force Intervention Brigade (FIB) authorised to use lethal force to achieve peace in the DRC. 6 SAIs involvement in the FIB saw the defeat of the M23 rebel group during the Battle of Kibati and other skirmishes. The first elements moved into the DRC on 28 April 2013 and the rest following from 15 June, with all 850 South African troops ready for action by 18 June.

Special Forces elements such as snipers were also attached to 6 SAI. When the FIB came under mortar fire, 6 SAI established an observation post at the triple towers site and engaged enemy targets up to 1400 meters.

Freedom of Grahamstown
On 28 August 2014, after their return from the Democratic Republic of Congo, the battalion was honoured with a Freedom of the City parade through Grahamstown.

Leadership

Insignia

Previous Dress Insignia

Current Dress Insignia

Gallery

Notes and references

Infantry battalions of South Africa
Infantry regiments of South Africa
Military units and formations in Grahamstown
Military units and formations established in 1962
United Nations Force Intervention Brigade